Erpetogomphus lampropeltis, the serpent ringtail, is a species of dragonfly in the family Gomphidae. It is found in Mexico and the United States.

References

Gomphidae
Taxonomy articles created by Polbot
Insects described in 1918